The Dutch Tweede Divisie in the 1957–58 season was contested by 29 teams, one less than in the previous season due to the voluntary return of FC Oss to amateur football. The teams were divided in two groups of fifteen and fourteen teams respectively. Teams could not be relegated to amateur football. ZFC and SC Heracles won the championships.

New entrants
Relegated from the Eerste Divisie:
 Emma (entered in group A)
 EBOH (entered in group A)
Group changes
The groups changed this season, group A from last season would be group B for this season, and the other way around.
N.E.C. changed groups and would play in group B this season.

Tweede Divisie A

Tweede Divisie B

See also
 1957–58 Eredivisie
 1957–58 Eerste Divisie

References
Netherlands - List of final tables (RSSSF)

Tweede Divisie seasons
3
Neth